A list of horror films released in 2000.

References

Lists of horror films by year
2000-related lists